Central Spain includes the cultural melting pot of Madrid and Castile.  A down-tempo version of jota is common, as well as other dances as fandango, habas verdes, 5/8 charrada.  Bagpipes are still used in northern León and Zamora provinces.  Tabor pipe (in León) and dulzaina (shawm) enjoy rich repertoires.
The city of Madrid is known for keeping its own version of chotis music.  Salamanca is home to tuna, a form of serenade played on guitar, bandurria and tambourine, traditionally by students in medieval clothing.

Castilian dances include:

Agudo
Agudillo
Charrada
Fandango
Jota
Jotilla
Habas verdes
Rebolada

The Province of León is dominated by palatial dances that are extremely complex:
Baile a lo Alto
Baile del Pandero
Danza de las Doncellas Cantadoras
Danza de la Muerte
El Corrido
La Giraldilla
Los Mandiles
Zapateta

Castile and Leon
Castilian music